was a town located in Hoi District, Aichi Prefecture, Japan.

On January 15, 2008, Otowa, along with the town of Mito (also from Hoi District), was merged into the expanded city of Toyokawa.

As of November 1, 2007 (the last census data prior to the merger), the town had an estimated population of 8,870 and a population density of 299.15 persons per km². The total area was 29.65 km².

Geography
Principal mountains:  Kyōgamine (京ヶ峰), Mt. Miyaji (宮路山), Shiro-yama (城山), Mt. Kan'non (観音山)
Principal rivers:  Otowa River (音羽川), Yamakage River (山陰川)

History
June 23, 1894 - Akasaka Village changed over to Akasaka Town (赤坂町).
April 1, 1955 - Otowa was founded by the unification of Akasaka Town, Nagasawa Village (長沢村) and Hagi Village (萩村).
1981 - Otowa Town Office was moved. Symbol of Otowa was established.
1986 - Tōmei Expressway Otowa-Gamagori Interchange opened.
1987 - The rezoning of Akasaka was carried. ( - 1993)
1992 - Otowa Town Field Park (音羽町運動公園) was completed.
1999 - Otowa Town Office was moved. New office and Cultural Hall ("Windia Hall") was completed.
2000 - Otowa Town Library and Akasaka Community Center was completed.
2002 - Akasaka Rest House (赤坂休憩所), commonly called "Yoramaikan (よらまいかん)" was completed.
2005 - Ceremony to celebrate the 50th anniversary of the founding Otowa Town was held.
January 15, 2008 - Otowa Town, along with Mito Town (also from Hoi District), was merged into the expanded Toyokawa City.

Administration

Successive mayors

Economy
Tokai Rika Otowa Factory

Region

Education

Primary schools
Akasaka Primary School
Nagasawa Primary School
Hagi Primary School

Junior High school
Otowa Junior High School

Social education

Ceremony Hall
Otowa Town Cultural Hall ("Windia Hall")

Community centers
Akasaka Community Center
Nagasawa Community Center
Hagi Community Center
Akasakadai Community Center

Library
Otowa Town Library

Athletic institution
Otowa Town Field Park

Transportation

Railway
Meitetsu Nagoya Main Line - Meiden-Akasaka Station, Meiden-Nagasawa Station

Road

Expressway
Interchange - Tōmei Expressway Otowa-Gamagori Interchange

Toll road
Toll road - Otowa-Gamagori Toll Road, commonly called "Mikawa Bay Orange Road (三河湾オレンジロード)"

National highway
National highway - Route 1

Bus
Tōmei Highway Bus: Otowa Bus Stop
Otowa Town Community Bus

Local attractions

Akasaka-juku (赤坂宿) - The thirty-sixth of the fifty-three stations of the Tōkaidō.
Mt. Miyaji (宮路山 Miyaji-san) - It is said that Empress Jitō visited this mountain. In the autumn, maple leaves turn red.
Ruins of the Nagasawa Castle (長沢城址) - Today, The Nagasawa Primary School and the residential area of Kojō (古城団地 Kojō Danchi) is located in this site. The word "Kojō" means "old castle".
Ceremony to pray for rain (雨乞い祭り amagoi matsuri) - A ceremony held in every August.
Ceremony of the Sugimori Hachimansha (杉森八幡社祭礼) - A ceremony held in every October. In this ceremony, the daimyō's procession is reenacted.

External links

 Toyokawa Official website 

Dissolved municipalities of Aichi Prefecture
Toyokawa, Aichi